Bas (c. 397 BC – 326) was the first independent ruler of Bithynia. He ruled for fifty years, from 376 to 326 BC, and died at the age of 71.

Life
Bas succeeded his father Boteiras, and was himself succeeded by his own son Zipoetes I.

Bas defeated Calas, a general of Alexander the Great, and maintained the independence of Bithynia.

References

Notes

Sources
Smith, William (editor); Dictionary of Greek and Roman Biography and Mythology, "Bas", Boston, (1867)

Dynasts of Bithynia
4th-century BC rulers
Opponents of Alexander the Great
390s BC births
326 BC deaths